Ravikumar Thakur (born 1 September 1984) is an Indian first-class cricketer who plays for Vidarbha.

References

External links
 

1984 births
Living people
Indian cricketers
Vidarbha cricketers
People from Akola